The 2022 Tohoku Rakuten Golden Eagles season is the 18th season of the Tohoku Rakuten Golden Eagles franchise. The Eagles play their home games at Rakuten Seimei Park Miyagi in the city of Sendai as members of Nippon Professional Baseball's Pacific League. The team is led by Kazuhisa Ishii in his second season as team manager.

Regular season

Standings

Record vs. opponents

Interleague

Opening Day roster 
Friday, March 25, 2022 vs. Chiba Lotte Marines

Game log

|-align="center" bgcolor="ffbbbb"
| 1 || March 25 || Marines || 0–4 || Ishikawa (1–0) || Norimoto (0–1) || — || Rakuten Seimei Park || 20,564 || 0–1–0 || L1
|-align="center" bgcolor="bbbbbb"
| — || March 26 || Marines || colspan=4|Postponed (rain) – Makeup date: August 4 || Rakuten Seimei Park || — || — || —
|-align="center" bgcolor="bbffbb"
| 2 || March 27 || Marines || 6–5  || Matsui (1–0) || Suzuki (0–1) || — || Rakuten Seimei Park || 19,903 || 1–1–0 || W1
|-align="center" bgcolor="bbffbb"
| 3 || March 29 || @ Buffaloes || 2–1 || Tanaka (1–0) || Kuroki (0–1) || Matsui (1) || Kyocera Dome || 26,237 || 2–1–0 || W2
|-align="center" bgcolor="bbffbb"
| 4 || March 30 || @ Buffaloes || 6–1 || Hayakawa (1–0) || Vargas (0–1) || — || Kyocera Dome || 17,835 || 3–1–0 || W3
|-align="center" bgcolor="bbffbb"
| 5 || March 31 || @ Buffaloes || 6–1 || Nishiguchi (1–0) || Hirano (0–1) || Matsui (2) || Kyocera Dome || 15,111 || 4–1–0 || W4
|-

|-align="center" bgcolor="ffbbbb"
| 6 || April 1 || Hawks || 0–1 || Senga (1–0) || Wakui (0–1) || Mori (5) || Rakuten Seimei Park || 15,111 || 4–2–0 || L1
|-align="center" bgcolor="bbbbbb"
| — || April 2 || Hawks || colspan=4|Postponed (COVID-19) – Makeup date: August 25 || Rakuten Seimei Park || — || — || —
|-align="center" bgcolor="bbbbbb"
| — || April 3 || Hawks || colspan=4|Postponed (COVID) – Makeup date: September 29 || Rakuten Seimei Park || — || — || —
|-align="center" bgcolor="bbffbb"
| 7 || April 5 || Lions || 7–3 || Tanaka (2–0) || Sato (1–1) || — || Rakuten Seimei Park || 16,893 || 5–2–0 || W1
|-align="center" bgcolor="bbffbb"
| 8 || April 6 || Lions || 7–2 || Kishi (1–0) || Matsumoto (1–1) || — || Rakuten Seimei Park || 16,870 || 6–2–0 || W2
|-align="center" bgcolor="bbffbb"
| 9 || April 8 || @ Fighters || 3–0 || Hayakawa (2–0) || Itoh (0–2) || Matsui (3) || Sapporo Dome || 9,854 || 7–2–0 || W3
|-align="center" bgcolor="bbffbb"
| 10 || April 9 || @ Fighters || 8–5 || Wakui (1–1) || Kawano (0–2) || — || Sapporo Dome || 13,994 || 8–2–0 || W4
|-align="center" bgcolor="ffbbbb"
| 11 || April 10 || @ Fighters || 2–3  || Kitayama (2–0) || Matsui (1–1) || — || Sapporo Dome || 12,141 || 8–3–0 || L1
|-align="center" bgcolor="bbbbbb"
| — || April 12 || Buffaoles || colspan=4|Postponed (COVID) – Makeup date: September 12 || Rakuten Seimei Park || — || — || —
|-align="center" bgcolor="bbbbbb"
| — || April 13 || Buffaoles || colspan=4|Postponed (COVID) – Makeup date: September 13 || Rakuten Seimei Park || — || — || —
|-align="center" bgcolor="bbbbbb"
| — || April 14 || Buffaoles || colspan=4|Postponed (COVID) – Makeup date: October 2 || Rakuten Seimei Park || — || — || —
|-align="center" bgcolor="bbffbb"
| 12 || April 16 || @ Hawks || 6–5 || Anraku (1–0) || Mori (0–3) || Matsui (4) || Kitakyushi Stadium || 18,709 || 9–3–0 || W1
|-align="center" bgcolor="bbffbb"
| 13 || April 17 || @ Hawks || 14–4 || Takinaka (1–0) || Higashihama (1–1) || — || Heiwa Lease Field || 17,796 || 10–3–0 || W2
|-align="center" bgcolor="ffbbbb"
| 14 || April 19 || Fighters || 0–2 || Kato (2–1) || Tanaka (2–1) || — || Rakuten Seimei Park || 15,119 || 10–4–0 || L1
|-align="center" bgcolor="bbffbb"
| 15 || April 20 || Fighters || 4–2 || Kishi (2–0) || Ponce (0–1) || Matsui (5) || Rakuten Seimei Park || 14,453 || 11–4–0 || W1
|-align="center" bgcolor="bbffbb"
| 16 || April 21 || Fighters || 8–5 || Ishibashi (1–0) || Tateno (1–2) || Matsui (6) || Rakuten Seimei Park || 15,131 || 12–4–0 || W2
|-align="center" bgcolor="ffbbbb"
| 17 || April 22 || @ Lions || 0–3 || Takahashi (2–2) || Hayakawa (2–1) || Taira (1) || Belluna Dome || 10,224 || 12–5–0 || L1
|-align="center" bgcolor="bbffbb"
| 18 || April 23 || @ Lions || 7–3 || Wakui (2–1) || Sumida (1–3) || — || Belluna Dome || 26,257 || 13–5–0 || W1
|-align="center" bgcolor="ffbbbb"
| 19 || April 24 || @ Lions || 3–6 || Hirai (2–1) || Takinaka (1–1) || — || Belluna Dome || 14,901 || 13–6–0 || L1
|-align="center" bgcolor="bbffbb"
| 20 || April 26 || @ Marines || 3–2  || Anraku (2–0) || Tojo (0–1) || Matsui (7) || Zozo Marine Stadium || 15,524 || 14–6–0 || W1
|-align="center" bgcolor="ffeeaa"
| 21 || April 27 || @ Marines || 3–3 || colspan=3|Game tied after 12 innings || Zozo Marine Stadium || 13,258 || 14–6–1 || T1
|-align="center" bgcolor="bbffbb"
| 22 || April 28 || @ Marines || 2–1 || Fujii (1–0) || Mima (0–3) || Anraku (1) || Zozo Marine Stadium || 17,531 || 15–6–1 || W1
|-align="center" bgcolor="bbbbbb"
| — || April 29 || Hawks || colspan=4|Postponed (rain) – Makeup date: September 30 || Rakuten Seimei Park || — || — || —
|-align="center" bgcolor="bbffbb"
| 23 || April 30 || Hawks  || 7–6 || Anraku (3–0) || Tsumori (1–1) || — || Rakuten Seimei Park || 25,602 || 16–6–1 || W2
|-

|-align="center" bgcolor="bbffbb"
| 24 || May 1 || Hawks || 2–1  || Norimoto (1–1) || Ohzeki (2–2) || Yuge (1) || Rakuten Seimei Park || 24,250 || 17–6–1 || W3
|-align="center" bgcolor="bbffbb"
| 25 || May 3 || @ Fighters || 2–1 || Tanaka (3–1) || Kato (2–2) || Matsui (8) || Sapporo Dome || 20,087 || 18–6–1 || W4
|-align="center" bgcolor="bbffbb"
| 26 || May 4 || @ Fighters || 5–1 || Wakui (3–1) || Kaneko (0–1) || — || Sapporo Dome || 20,184 || 19–6–1 || W5
|-align="center" bgcolor="bbffbb"
| 27 || May 5 || @ Fighters || 8–4 || Kishi (3–0) || Itoh (3–3) || — || Sapporo Dome || 16,420 || 20–6–1 || W6
|-align="center" bgcolor="bbffbb"
| 28 || May 6 || @ Buffaloes || 3–2 || Busenitz (1–0) || Hirano (2–2) || Matsui (9) || Kyocera Dome || 16,430 || 21–6–1 || W7
|-align="center" bgcolor="bbffbb"
| 29 || May 7 || @ Buffaloes || 7–1 || Hayakawa (3–1) || Yamasaki (0–4) || — || Kyocera Dome || 18,340 || 22–6–1 || W8
|-align="center" bgcolor="bbffbb"
| 30 || May 8 || @ Buffaloes || 2–1  || Sung (1–0) || Kuroki (0–2) || Matsui (10) || Kyocera Dome || 16,296 || 23–6–1 || W9
|-align="center" bgcolor="bbffbb"
| 31 || May 10 || Marines || 7–0 || Tanaka (4–1) || Ojima (0–4) || — || Rakuten Seimei Park || 22,005 || 24–6–1 || W10
|-align="center" bgcolor="ffbbbb"
| 32 || May 11 || Marines || 1–3 || Kawamura (2–0) || Fujii (1–1) || Masuda (5) || Rakuten Seimei Park || 23,110 || 24–7–1 || L1
|-align="center" bgcolor="ffbbbb"
| 33 || May 12 || Marines || 2–5 || Mima (1–4) || Kishi (3–1) || Masuda (6) || Rakuten Seimei Park || 20,089 || 24–8–1 || L2
|-align="center" bgcolor="ffbbbb"
| 34 || May 13 || @ Lions || 2–4 || Takahashi (4–2) || Takinaka (1–2) || Masuda (8) || Belluna Dome || 10,121 || 24–9–1 || L3
|-align="center" bgcolor="ffbbbb"
| 35 || May 14 || @ Lions || 4–5 || Moriwaki (1–0) || Anraku (3–1) || Masuda (9) || Belluna Dome || 12,091 || 24–10–1 || L4
|-align="center" bgcolor="bbffbb"
| 36 || May 15 || @ Lions || 3–1 || Norimoto (2–1) || Enns (2–2) || Matsui (11) || Belluna Dome || 21,224 || 25–10–1 || W1
|-align="center" bgcolor="ffbbbb"
| 37 || May 17 || @ Marines || 3–6 || Sasaki (1–0) || Tanaka (4–2) || Masuda (7) || Zozo Marine Stadium || 21,001 || 25–11–1 || L1
|-align="center" bgcolor="ffbbbb"
| 38 || May 18 || @ Marines || 0–1  || Tojo (1–1) || Sakai (0–1) || — || Zozo Marine Stadium || 20,084 || 25–12–1 || L2
|-align="center" bgcolor="bbffbb"
| 39 || May 19 || @ Marines || 7–2 || Kishi (4–1) || Sasaki (1–1) || — || Zozo Marine Stadium || 19,930 || 26–12–1 || W1
|-align="center" bgcolor="ffbbbb"
| 40 || May 20 || Buffaloes || 0–1 || Tajima (1–2) || Takinaka (1–3) || Hirano (13) || Rakuten Seimei Park || 17,239 || 26–13–1 || L1
|-align="center" bgcolor="ffbbbb"
| 41 || May 21 || Buffaloes || 0–6 || Yamamoto (5–2) || Hayakawa (3–2) || — || Rakuten Seimei Park || 18,306 || 26–14–1 || L2
|-align="center" bgcolor="ffbbbb"
| 42 || May 22 || Buffaloes || 0–6 || Miyagi (3–2) || Norimoto (2–2) || — || Rakuten Seimei Park || 17,896 || 26–15–1 || L3
|-align="center" bgcolor="ffbbbb"
| 43 || May 24 || @ Tigers || 0–1 || Nishi (3–3) || Tanaka (4–3) || Iwazaki (7) || Koshien Stadium || 33,186 || 26–16–1 || L4
|-align="center" bgcolor="bbffbb"
| 44 || May 25 || @ Tigers || 6–1 || Karashima (1–0) || Nishi (2–1) || — || Koshien Stadium || 31,493 || 27–16–1 || W1
|-align="center" bgcolor="bbffbb"
| 45 || May 26 || @ Tigers || 1–0 || Sung (2–0) || Iwazaki (1–2) || Matsui (12) || Koshien Stadium || 26,255 || 28–16–1 || W2
|-align="center" bgcolor="ffbbbb"
| 46 || May 27 || Swallows || 1–8 || Takahashi (4–1) || Takinaka (1–4) || — || Rakuten Seimei Park || 17,688 || 28–17–1 || L1
|-align="center" bgcolor="ffbbbb"
| 47 || May 28 || Swallows || 4–11 || Kizawa (3–1) || Hayakawa (3–3) || — || Rakuten Seimei Park || 23,629 || 28–18–1 || L2
|-align="center" bgcolor="bbffbb"
| 48 || May 29 || Swallows || 3–1 || Norimoto (3–2) || Ishikawa (2–3) || Matsui (13) || Rakuten Seimei Park || 22,534 || 29–18–1 || W1
|-align="center" bgcolor="ffbbbb"
| 49 || May 31 || @ Dragons || 0–2 || Ogasawara (3–3) || Tanaka (4–4) || Martínez (13) || Vantelin Dome || 18,827 || 29–19–1 || L1
|-

|-align="center" bgcolor="bbffbb"
| 50 || June 1 || @ Dragons || 2–0 || Karashima (2–0) || Ueda (0–2) || Matsui (14) || Vantelin Dome || 16,536 || 30–19–1 || W1
|-align="center" bgcolor="ffbbbb"
| 51 || June 2 || @ Dragons || 2–3 || Matsuba (3–1) || Kishi (4–2) || Martínez (14) || Vantelin Dome || 16,214 || 30–20–1 || L1
|-align="center" bgcolor="ffbbbb"
| 52 || June 3 || @ BayStars || 0–7 || Ohnuki (4–2) || Takinaka (1–5) || — || Yokohama Stadium || 26,201 || 30–21–1 || L2
|-align="center" bgcolor="ffbbbb"
| 53 || June 4 || @ BayStars || 1–6 || Kriske (1–1) || Sung (2–1) || — || Yokohama Stadium || 31,130 || 30–22–1 || L3
|-align="center" bgcolor="bbffbb"
| 54 || June 5 || @ BayStars || 6–5 || Anraku (4–1) || Yamasaki (0–2) || Matsui (15) || Yokohama Stadium || 27,125 || 31–22–1 || W1
|-align="center" bgcolor="ffbbbb"
| 55 || June 7 || Carp || 1–3 || Tokoda (6–3) || Tanaka (4–5) || Kuribayashi (12) || Rakuten Seimei Park || 14,558 || 31–23–1 || L1
|-align="center" bgcolor="bbffbb"
| 56 || June 8 || Carp || 1–0  || Sung (3–1) || Matsumoto (0–1) || — || Rakuten Seimei Park || 15,044 || 32–23–1 || W1
|-align="center" bgcolor="bbffbb"
| 57 || June 9 || Carp || 4–1 || Kishi (5–2) || Kuri (3–4) || Matsui (16) || Rakuten Seimei Park || 15,186 || 33–23–1 || W2
|-align="center" bgcolor="ffbbbb"
| 58 || June 10 || Giants || 1–4 || Togo (7–3) || Fujii (1–1) || — || Rakuten Seimei Park || 19,259 || 33–24–1 || L1
|-align="center" bgcolor="bbffbb"
| 59 || June 11 || Giants || 8–1 || Hayakawa (4–3) || Mercedes (5–2) || — || Rakuten Seimei Park || 25,585 || 34–24–1 || W1
|-align="center" bgcolor="bbffbb"
| 60 || June 12 || Giants || 9–2 || Norimoto (4–2) || Yamasaki (2–3) || — || Rakuten Seimei Park || 22,870 || 35–24–1 || W2
|-align="center" bgcolor="ffbbbb"
| 61 || June 17 || @ Hawks || 4–9 || Senga (4–2) || Tanaka (4–6) || — || PayPay Dome || 31,322 || 35–25–1 || L1
|-align="center" bgcolor="ffbbbb"
| 62 || June 18 || @ Hawks || 1–3  || Matayoshi (2–3) || Matsui (1–2) || — || PayPay Dome || 31,057 || 35–26–1 || L2
|-align="center" bgcolor="ffbbbb"
| 63 || June 19 || @ Hawks || 1–4 || Wada (2–1) || Hayakawa (4–4) || Moinelo (10) || PayPay Dome || 31,595 || 35–27–1 || L3
|-align="center" bgcolor="bbffbb"
| 64 || June 21 || Fighters || 3–0 || Norimoto (5–2) || Yoshida (1–2) || Matsui (17) || Komachi Stadium || 17,128 || 36–27–1 || W1
|-align="center" bgcolor="bbffbb"
| 65 || June 22 || Fighters || 6–3 || Nishiguchi (2–0) || Kitayama (3–5) || — || Iwate Stadium || 15,585 || 37–27–1 || W2
|-align="center" bgcolor="ffbbbb"
| 66 || June 24 || Lions || 3–4 || Takahashi (6–6) || Tanaka (4–7) || Masuda (19) || Rakuten Seimei Park || 18,045 || 37–28–1 || L1
|-align="center" bgcolor="ffbbbb"
| 67 || June 25 || Lions || 0–2 || Hirai (4–4) || Karashima (2–1) || Masuda (20) || Rakuten Seimei Park || 24,914 || 37–29–1 || L2
|-align="center" bgcolor="ffbbbb"
| 68 || June 26 || Lions || 0–2 || Yoza (5–2) || Hayakawa (4–5) || Moriwaki (1) || Rakuten Seimei Park || 22,367 || 37–30–1 || L3
|-align="center" bgcolor="bbffbb"
| 69 || June 28 || @ Buffaloes || 4–2 || Norimoto (6–2) || Miyagi (6–4) || Matsui (18) || Hotto Motto Field || 16,961 || 38–30–1 || W1
|-align="center" bgcolor="ffbbbb"
| 70 || June 29 || @ Buffaloes || 1–6 || Tajima (4–3) || Kishi (5–3) || — || Hotto Motto Field || 17,093 || 38–31–1 || L1
|-

|-align="center" bgcolor="ffbbbb"
| 71 || July 1 || @ Marines || 4–6 || Guerrero (2–2) || Sung (3–2) || Masuda (18) || Zozo Marine Stadium || 20,194 || 38–32–1 || L2
|-align="center" bgcolor="ffbbbb"
| 72 || July 2 || @ Marines || 1–3 || Osuna (2–0) || Suzuki (0–1) || Masuda (19) || Zozo Marine Stadium || 19,090 || 38–33–1 || L3
|-align="center" bgcolor="bbffbb"
| 73 || July 3 || @ Marines || 14–1 || Hayakawa (5–5) || Mima (4–5) || — || Zozo Marine Stadium || 17,389 || 39–33–1 || W1
|-align="center" bgcolor="ffbbbb"
| 74 || July 5 || Hawks || 2–6 || Ohzeki (6–3) || Norimoto (6–3) || — || Hirosaki Stadium || 10,191 || 39–34–1 || L1
|-align="center" bgcolor="bbffbb"
| 75 || July 7 || Hawks || 5–2 || Kishi (6–3) || Otake (0–2) || Matsui (19) || Rakuten Seimei Park || 20,058 || 40–34–1 || W1
|-align="center" bgcolor="ffbbbb"
| 76 || July 8 || Lions || 4–8 || Mizukami (2–1) || Suzuki (0–2) || — || Rakuten Seimei Park || 22,605 || 40–35–1 || L1
|-align="center" bgcolor="ffbbbb"
| 77 || July 9 || Lions || 3–6 || Mizukami (3–1) || Suzuki (0–3) || Masuda (22) || Rakuten Seimei Park || 19,969 || 40–36–1 || L2
|-align="center" bgcolor="ffbbbb"
| 78 || July 10 || Lions || 3–6 || Yoza (6–3) || Hayakawa (5–6) || — || Rakuten Seimei Park || 21,791 || 40–37–1 || L3
|-align="center" bgcolor="ffbbbb"
| 79 || July 13 || @ Fighters || 2–3 || Ponce (1–1) || Norimoto (6–4) || Hori (3) || Kusanagi Stadium || 12,535 || 40–38–1 || L4
|-align="center" bgcolor="ffbbbb"
| 80 || July 14 || @ Fighters || 0–6 || Kato (4–4) || Kishi (6–4) || — || Kusanagi Stadium || 10,449 || 40–39–1 || L5
|-align="center" bgcolor="bbffbb"
| 81 || July 16 || Buffaloes || 7–3 || Tanaka (5–7) || Yamamoto (6–4) || — || Rakuten Seimei Park || 18,730 || 41–39–1 || W1
|-align="center" bgcolor="ffbbbb"
| 82 || July 17 || Buffaloes || 3–7 || Tajima (6–3) || Karashima (2–2) || Hirano (23) || Rakuten Seimei Park || 18,158 || 41–40–1 || L1
|-align="center" bgcolor="bbffbb"
| 83 || July 18 || Buffaloes || 8–3 || Sung (4–2) || Suzuki (0–1) || — || Rakuten Seimei Park || 17,774 || 42–40–1 || W1
|-align="center" bgcolor="bbffbb"
| 84 || July 20 || @ Hawks || 17–3 || Takinaka (2–5) || Ohzeki (6–5) || — || Kitakyushi Stadium || 16,725 || 43–40–1 || W2
|-align="center" bgcolor="ffbbbb"
| 85 || July 21 || @ Hawks || 0–7 || Senga (8–3) || Kishi (6–5) || — || PayPay Dome || 29,254 || 43–41–1 || L1
|-align="center" bgcolor="ffbbbb"
| 86 || July 22 || @ Lions || 4–9 || Watanabe (1–1) || Norimoto (6–5) || — || Belluna Dome || 19,546 || 43–42–1 || L2
|-align="center" bgcolor="ffeeaa"
| 87 || July 23 || @ Lions || 3–3 || colspan=3|Game tied after 12 innings || Belluna Dome || 26,641 || 43–42–2 || T1
|-align="center" bgcolor="bbffbb"
| 88 || July 24 || @ Lions || 9–2 || Karashima (3–2) || Hirai (5–5) || — || Belluna Dome || 13,973 || 44–42–2 || W1
|- align="center"
|colspan="11" bgcolor="#bbffff"|All-Star Break: PL defeats the CL, 2–0
|-align="center" bgcolor="ffbbbb"
| 89 || July 29 || Fighters || 1–2 || Ponce (2–2) || Takinaka (2–6) || Kitaura (1) || Rakuten Seimei Park || 21,057 || 44–43–2 || L1
|-align="center" bgcolor="bbffbb"
| 90 || July 30 || Fighters || 7–0 || Tanaka (6–7) || Tanaka (1–2) || — || Rakuten Seimei Park || 26,136 || 45–43–2 || W1
|-align="center" bgcolor="bbffbb"
| 91 || July 31 || Fighters || 10–5 || Ishibashi (2–0) || Miyanishi (0–3) || — || Rakuten Seimei Park || 20,105 || 46–43–2 || W2
|-

|-align="center" bgcolor="ffbbbb"
| 92 || August 2 || Marines || 4–6 || Romero (8–5) || Norimoto (6–6) || Masuda (24) || Rakuten Seimei Park || 16,560 || 46–44–2 || L1
|-align="center" bgcolor="bbffbb"
| 93 || August 3 || Marines || 5–4 || Sakai (1–1) || Sasaki (6–2) || Matsui (20) || Rakuten Seimei Park || 15,717 || 47–44–2 || W1
|-align="center" bgcolor="bbffbb"
| 94 || August 4 || Marines || 10–1 || Kishi (7–5) || Motomae (3–2) || — || Rakuten Seimei Park || 15,038 || 48–44–2 || W2
|-align="center" bgcolor="ffbbbb"
| 95 || August 5 || @ Hawks || 3–7 || Matsumoto (4–0) || Takinaka (2–7) || — || PayPay Dome || 27,439 || 48–45–2 || L1
|-align="center" bgcolor="ffbbbb"
| 96 || August 6 || @ Hawks || 1–9 || Takeda (1–0) || Tanaka (6–8) || — || PayPay Dome || 29,578 || 48–46–2 || L2
|-align="center" bgcolor="bbffbb"
| 97 || August 7 || @ Hawks || 7–2 || Miyamori (1–0) || Wada (3–3) || — || PayPay Dome || 29,544 || 49–46–2 || W1
|-align="center" bgcolor="ffbbbb"
| 98 || August 9 || @ Buffaloes || 1–5 || Tajima (8–3) || Norimoto (6–7) || — || Kyocera Dome || 16,347 || 49–47–2 || L1
|-align="center" bgcolor="bbffbb"
| 99 || August 10 || @ Buffaloes || 2–1  || Nishiguchi (3–0) || Waguespack (2–6) || Matsui (21) || Kyocera Dome || 17,766 || 50–47–2 || W1
|-align="center" bgcolor="ffbbbb"
| 100 || August 11 || @ Buffaloes || 1–6 || Miyagi (7–6) || Yuge (1–0) || — || Kyocera Dome || 24,037 || 50–48–2 || L1
|-align="center" bgcolor="ffbbbb"
| 101 || August 12 || Lions || 1–5 || Imai (3–1) || Kishi (7–6) || — || Rakuten Seimei Park || 21,128 || 50–49–2 || L2
|-align="center" bgcolor="ffbbbb"
| 102 || August 13 || Lions || 4–6 || Yoza (9–3) || Tanaka (6–9) || Smith (1) || Rakuten Seimei Park || 19,659 || 50–50–2 || L3
|-align="center" bgcolor="bbffbb"
| 103 || August 14 || Lions || 4–3 || Nishiguchi (4–0) || Mizukami (4–3) || Matsui (22) || Rakuten Seimei Park || 19,366 || 51–50–2 || W1
|-align="center" bgcolor="bbffbb"
| 104 || August 16 || @ Fighters || 2–1 || Norimoto (7–7) || Nemoto (2–3) || Matsui (23) || Sapporo Dome || 17,859 || 52–50–2 || W2
|-align="center" bgcolor="bbffbb"
| 105 || August 17 || @ Fighters || 8–2 || Karashima (4–2) || Uehara (3–4) || — || Sapporo Dome || 17,341 || 53–50–2 || W3
|-align="center" bgcolor="bbffbb"
| 106 || August 18 || @ Fighters || 2–1 || Busenitz (2–0) || Itoh (9–8) || Matsui (24) || Sapporo Dome || 17,632 || 54–50–2 || W4
|-align="center" bgcolor="ffbbbb"
| 107 || August 19 || Marines || 5–6 || Sasaki (7–3) || Kishi (7–7) || Osuna (2) || Rakuten Seimei Park || 21,215 || 54–51–2 || L1
|-align="center" bgcolor="bbffbb"
| 108 || August 20 || Marines || 5–2 || Tanaka (7–9) || Romero (8–7) || Matsui (25) || Rakuten Seimei Park || 22,874 || 55–51–2 || W1
|-align="center" bgcolor="bbffbb"
| 109 || August 21 || Marines || 1–0 || Fujihira (1–0) || Ojima (2–9) || Matsui (26) || Rakuten Seimei Park || 18,449 || 56–51–2 || W2
|-align="center" bgcolor="ffbbbb"
| 110 || August 23 || Hawks || 6–15 || Ishikawa (5–7) || Norimoto (7–8) || — || Rakuten Seimei Park || 16,801 || 56–52–2 || L1
|-align="center" bgcolor="ffbbbb"
| 111 || August 24 || Hawks || 3–4  || Kaino (1–0) || Busenitz (2–1) || Tsumori (1) || Rakuten Seimei Park || 16,259 || 56–53–2 || L2
|-align="center" bgcolor="bbffbb"
| 112 || August 25 || Hawks || 7–5 || Suzuki (1–3) || Bandoh (1–1) || Matsui (27) || Rakuten Seimei Park || 14,312 || 57–53–2 || W1
|-align="center" bgcolor="ffbbbb"
| 113 || August 26 || @ Marines || 0–2 || Sasaki (8–3) || Kishi (7–8) || Osuna (4) || Zozo Marine Stadium || 24,313 || 57–54–2 || L1
|-align="center" bgcolor="bbffbb"
| 114 || August 27 || @ Marines || 11–3 || Tanaka (8–9) || Romero (8–8) || — || Zozo Marine Stadium || 25,912 || 58–54–2 || W1
|-align="center" bgcolor="ffbbbb"
| 115 || August 28 || @ Marines || 2–9 || Ojima (3–9) || Hayakawa (5–7) || — || Zozo Marine Stadium || 26,771 || 58–55–2 || L1
|-align="center" bgcolor="ffbbbb"
| 116 || August 30 || Buffaloes || 3–4 || Higa (4–0) || Matsui (1–3) || Hirano (28) || Rakuten Seimei Park || 18,901 || 58–56–2 || L2
|-align="center" bgcolor="ffbbbb"
| 117 || August 31 || Buffaloes || 3–8 || Tajima (9–3) || Karashima (4–3) || — || Rakuten Seimei Park || 13,017 || 58–57–2 || L3
|-

|-align="center" bgcolor="bbffbb"
| 118 || September 1 || Buffaloes || 11–8 || Anraku (5–1) || Biddle (4–5) || Matsui (28) || Rakuten Seimei Park || 12,187 || 59–57–2 || W1
|-align="center" bgcolor="ffbbbb"
| 119 || September 2 || Fighters || 1–3 || Itoh (10–9) || Kishi (7–9) || Ishikawa (4) || Rakuten Seimei Park || 15,068 || 59–58–2 || L1
|-align="center" bgcolor="bbffbb"
| 120 || September 3 || Fighters || 5–4  || Anraku (6–1) || Hori (1–3) || — || Rakuten Seimei Park || 21,625 || 60–58–2 || W1
|-align="center" bgcolor="ffbbbb"
| 121 || September 4 || Fighters || 2–8 || Kato (6–6) || Hayakawa (5–8) || — || Rakuten Seimei Park || 18,748 || 60–59–2 || L1
|-align="center" bgcolor="ffbbbb"
| 122 || September 6 || @ Hawks || 2–4 || Wada (5–4) || Takinaka (2–8) || Moinelo (20) || PayPay Dome || 25,851 || 60–60–2 || L2
|-align="center" bgcolor="bbffbb"
| 123 || September 7 || @ Hawks || 4–3 || Karashima (5–3) || Ishikawa (5–9) || Matsui (29) || PayPay Dome || 28,441 || 61–60–2 || W1
|-align="center" bgcolor="bbffbb"
| 124 || September 8 || @ Hawks || 7–3 || Wakui (4–1) || Rea (5–5) || — || PayPay Dome || 30,452 || 62–60–2 || W2
|-align="center" bgcolor="ffbbbb"
| 125 || September 10 || Marines || 4–6 || Nishino (2–2) || Tanaka (8–10) || Osuna (7) || Rakuten Seimei Park || 19,274 || 62–61–2 || L1
|-align="center" bgcolor="bbffbb"
| 126 || September 11 || Marines || 3–2 || Kishi (8–9) || Karakawa (2–1) || Matsui (30) || Rakuten Seimei Park || 20,657 || 63–61–2 || W1
|-align="center" bgcolor="bbffbb"
| 127 || September 12 || Buffaloes || 8–2 || Norimoto (8–8) || Miyagi (10–7) || — || Rakuten Seimei Park || 14,115 || 64–61–2 || W2
|-align="center" bgcolor="ffeeaa"
| 128 || September 13 || Buffaloes  || 3–3 || colspan=3|Game tied after 12 innings || Rakuten Seimei Park || 12,715 || 64–61–3 || T1
|-align="center" bgcolor="ffbbbb"
| 129 || September 15 || Hawks || 3–7 || Wada (6–4) || Karashima (5–4) || — || Rakuten Seimei Park || 15,078 || 64–62–3 || L1
|-align="center" bgcolor="ffbbbb"
| 130 || September 16 || Hawks || 2–6 || Kaino (2–0) || Wakui (4–2) || — || Rakuten Seimei Park || 16,336 || 64–63–3 || L2
|-align="center" bgcolor="bbffbb"
| 131 || September 17 || @ Lions || 3–0 || Tanaka (9–10) || Matsumoto (6–6) || Matsui (31) || Belluna Dome || 24,167 || 65–63–3 || W1
|-align="center" bgcolor="bbffbb"
| 132 || September 18 || @ Lions || 4–3 || Norimoto (9–8) || Yoza (10–7) || Matsui (32) || Belluna Dome || 27,471 || 66–63–3 || W2
|-align="center" bgcolor="bbffbb"
| 133 || September 19 || @ Lions || 6–4  || Busenitz (3–1) || Masuda (2–5) || Miyamori (1) || Belluna Dome || 27,475 || 67–63–3 || W3
|-align="center" bgcolor="ffbbbb"
| 134 || September 20 || @ Lions || 1–4 || Takahashi (11–8) || Takinaka (2–9) || Taira (8) || Belluna Dome || 14,063 || 67–64–3 || L1
|-align="center" bgcolor="ffbbbb"
| 135 || September 23 || Fighters || 3–6  || Rodriguez (3–2) || Miyamori (1–1) || — || Rakuten Seimei Park || 23,319 || 67–65–3 || L2
|-align="center" bgcolor="ffbbbb"
| 136 || September 24 || Buffaloes|| 1–9 || Yamamoto (15–5) || Tanaka (9–11) || — || Rakuten Seimei Park || 21,332 || 67–66–3 || L3
|-align="center" bgcolor="bbffbb"
| 137 || September 25 || @ Fighters || 6–0 || Karashima (6–4) || Matsuura (0–1) || — || Sapporo Dome || 22,619 || 68–66–3 || W1
|-align="center" bgcolor="ffbbbb"
| 138 || September 26 || @ Fighters || 2–3 || Kato (8–7) || Hayakawa (5–9) || Itoh (1) || Sapporo Dome || 16,923 || 68–67–3 || L1
|-align="center" bgcolor="bbffbb"
| 139 || September 27 || @ Buffaloes || 6–1 || Norimoto (10–8) || Miyagi (11–8) || — || Kyocera Dome || 20,092 || 69–67–3 || W1
|-align="center" bgcolor="ffbbbb"
| 140 || September 28 || Lions || 0–1 || Imai (5–1) || Kishi (8–10) || Taira (9) || Rakuten Seimei Park || 17,313 || 69–68–3 || L1
|-align="center" bgcolor="ffbbbb"
| 141 || September 29 || Hawks || 4–5 || Ohzeki (7–6) || Anraku (6–2) || Moinelo (24) || Rakuten Seimei Park || 14,360 || 69–69–3 || L2
|-align="center" bgcolor="ffbbbb"
| 142 || September 30 || Hawks || 1–5 || Wada (7–4) || Wakui (4–3) || — || Rakuten Seimei Park || 18,642 || 69–70–3 || L3
|-

|-align="center" bgcolor="ffbbbb"
| 143 || October 2 || Buffaloes || 2–5 || Udagawa (2–1) || Tanaka (9–12) || Abe (3) || Rakuten Seimei Park || 25,339 || 69–71–3 || L4
|-

|-
| Legend:       = Win       = Loss       = Tie       = PostponementBold = Eagles team member

Roster

Player statistics

Batting 

†Denotes player joined the team mid-season. Stats reflect time with the Eagles only.
‡Denotes player left the team mid-season. Stats reflect time with the Eagles only.
Bold/italics denotes best in the league

Pitching 

†Denotes player joined the team mid-season. Stats reflect time with the Eagles only.
‡Denotes player left the team mid-season. Stats reflect time with the Eagles only.
Bold/italics denotes best in the league

Awards and honors
Taiju Life Monthly MVP Award
 Haruki Nishikawa - March/April (batter)
 Hiroaki Shimauchi - August (batter)

Best Nine Award
 Hideto Asamura - second baseman
 Hiroaki Shimauchi - outfielder

Mitsui Golden Glove Award
 Ryosuke Tatsumi - outfielder

All-Star Series selections
 Kazuhisa Ishii - coach
 Hideto Asamura - second baseman
 Takayuki Kishi - pitcher
 Hiroto Kobukata - infielder
 Yuki Matsui - pitcher
 Takahiro Norimoto - pitcher
 Hiroaki Shimauchi - outfielder

Speed Up Award
 Hiroto Kobukata (batter)

SKY Perfect! Sayonara Award
 Hideto Asamura - March/April
 Hiroaki Shimauchi - June

Farm team

Nippon Professional Baseball draft

References

Tohoku Rakuten Golden Eagles seasons